Cameron Alexander may refer to:

 Cameron M. Alexander (1932–2018), American Baptist church and community leader
 Cameron Alexander, a character in American History X
 Cameron Alexander (alpine skier) (born 1997), Canadian alpine skier

See also
Alexander Cameron (disambiguation)
Alexander (surname)